Kresimir Kovacević (born 7 August 1994) is a German-born Croat footballer who plays for Croatian second tier side Rudeš.

Career

SV Lafnitz
On 16 January 2020 it was confirmed, Kovacević joined SV Lafnitz on a deal for the rest of the season.

SKN St. Pölten
On 9 September 2021, he returned to Austria and signed a one-year contract with SKN St. Pölten.

References

External links
Krešimir Kovačević at SV Lafnitz' website

1994 births
Living people
People from Treuchtlingen
Sportspeople from Middle Franconia
Footballers from Bavaria
German people of Croatian descent
Association football forwards
German footballers
Croatian footballers
NK Sesvete players
NK Dubrava players
TSV Hartberg players
NK Kustošija players
SV Lafnitz players
NK Lokomotiva Zagreb players
Ermis Aradippou FC players
SKN St. Pölten players
Hapoel Acre F.C. players
NK Rudeš players
First Football League (Croatia) players
2. Liga (Austria) players
Austrian Football Bundesliga players
Croatian Football League players
Cypriot First Division players
Liga Leumit players
Croatian expatriate footballers
Expatriate footballers in Austria
Expatriate footballers in Cyprus
Expatriate footballers in Israel
Croatian expatriate sportspeople in Austria
Croatian expatriate sportspeople in Cyprus
Croatian expatriate sportspeople in Israel